was a Japanese-Korean idol girl group formed by R & C Ltd. in 2002. The group consists of Marina Takahashi and Choi Soo-young.

History

In December 2001, Asayan held the Japanese-Korean Ultra Idol Duo Audition, which was broadcast on TV Tokyo. Out of 15,000 applicants, Marina Takahashi was chosen as the Japanese representative, while Choi Soo-young was chosen as the Korean representative.

Route 0 released "Start" as their first single on April 26, 2002, which was used as the opening theme song to Hamaraja. The song was produced by Ryuichi Kawamura. They also appeared on Oha Suta for a 3-day television feature, as well as exclusive models for the junior fashion brand Chubbygang and the magazine Melon. "Waku Waku It's Love" was released on November 9, 2002, as the ending theme song to Hey! Hey! Hey! Music Champ for the month of November 2002. On July 23, 2003, Route 0 released "Painting" as their third single, which was the ending theme song to Downtown DX. On the same day, a video single version of "Painting" was also released. After 2003, Route 0 ended activities together. Takahashi retired from entertainment, while Soo-young would later go on to become a member of South Korean girl group Girls' Generation in 2007 and actress.

Members

Discography

Singles

Video singles

References

External links

 

Girls' Generation
Japanese girl groups
Japanese idol groups
Japanese pop music groups
Japanese musical duos
J-pop music groups
Musical groups established in 2002
Musical groups disestablished in 2003
Musical groups from Tokyo
Singing talent show winners